The University of Sherbrooke (French: Université de Sherbrooke) (UdS) is a French-language public research university in Sherbrooke, Quebec, Canada, with a second campus in Longueuil, a suburb on the South Shore of Montreal. It is one of two universities in the Estrie region of Quebec (the other one being Bishop's University), and the only French-language university for the region.

As of 2022, the Université de Sherbrooke is home to 31,000 students, and an additional 3,000 older learners (age 50+) in continuing education in its "University of the Third Age". Of its 7,400 employees, about 4,000 are teaching staff. The university has over 100,000 graduates and offers 46 undergraduate, 48 master's and 27 doctoral programs. It holds a total of 61 research chairs, among which are the pharmacology, microelectronics, statistical learning, and environment research chairs.

Campus
The Université de Sherbrooke has five campuses:

 The Main Sherbrooke Campus
 The Sherbrooke Health Campus
 The Longueuil Campus
 The Joint Campus in Saguenay (on the site of the Université du Québec à Chicoutimi)
 The Joint Campus in Moncton (on the site of the Université de Moncton, in Moncton, New Brunswick).

History
The Université de Sherbrooke was established in 1954 as a French-speaking Catholic university in a region that was predominantly English speaking, the Estrie, or Eastern Townships in English. The only university in this region for over 100 years was the English-based Anglican Bishop's University. The Roman Catholic Church created this university in an effort to provide a more convenient education for the Catholic and French speakers in the region, then as a minority. Initially there was a religious component to the pedagogical activities, but by the end of the 1960s the number of priests working for the university had greatly diminished during Quiet Revolution. In 1975, the appointment of a layman as Rector marked the end of religious activity in the institution. The Department of Theology is still officially Roman Catholic, alone in Quebec in this regard.

Université de Sherbrooke's arms, supporters, flag, and badge were registered with the Canadian Heraldic Authority on January 15, 2004. Université de Sherbrooke's crest and Supporters were registered with the Canadian Heraldic Authority on April 20, 2007. The motto of the school is Veritatem in Charitate ("Truth through charity").

In 2006, the university opened a branch of its medical facility on the campus of UQAC, where its students enrol for medical courses. The number of students attending the Université de Sherbrooke continues to rise and the university has worked with the City of Sherbrooke to respond to the increase. Activities at the Université de Sherbrooke are mainly centred on teaching and research.

Rectors
 2017–present: Pierre Cossette
 2009–2017: Luce Samoisette
 2001–2009: Bruno-Marie Béchard Marinier
 1993–2001: Pierre Reid
 1985–1993: Aldée Cabana
 1981–1985: Claude Hamel
 1975–1981: Yves Martin
 1965–1975: Mgr. Roger Maltais
 1955–1965: Mgr. Irénée Pinard
 1954–1955: Mgr. Maurice Vincent

Institutions

The Université de Sherbrooke is composed of the following faculties:

 Faculty of Administration
 Faculty of Education
 Faculty of Engineering
 Faculty of Law
 Faculty of Letters and Humanities
 Faculty of Medicine and Health Sciences
 Faculty of Sports and Physical Education
 Faculty of Science
 Faculty of Theology, Ethics and Philosophy

The Main Sherbrooke Campus includes:

 Administration
 Support services
 Most faculties
 The George-Cabana Pavilion (central pavilion)
 The Multifunctional Pavilion
 The Univestrie Pavilion (sports centre)
 The Cultural Centre and Maurice-O'Bready Theatre
 The Humanities Library
 The Law and Government Publications Library
 The Music Library
 The Science and Engineering Library
 The Documentation Centre
 The Anne-Hébert Centre
 The Pedagogical Resource Centre
 The Jean-Marie Roy Map Library
 Student residences

The Sherbrooke Health Campus includes:

 The Faculty of Medicine and Health Sciences
 The Institute of Pharmacology of Sherbrooke
 The Sherbrooke University Hospital
 The Centre for Clinical Research
 The Biotechnology Research Centre in Estrie
 The Gérald-La Salle Pavilion
 The Health Sciences Library
 The Pavillon de Recherche Appliquée sur le Cancer (PRAC)
 A sports centre
 Student residences

The Longueuil Campus was founded in 1989. Today it offers more than 90 educational programs, primarily at the master's level, in eight of the nine faculties of the university (Administration; Education; Engineering; Law; Letters and Humanities; Medicine and Health Sciences; Science; Theology, Ethics and Philosophy). Whether at the undergraduate or graduate level, most programs are offered on a part-time basis on evenings and weekends, or in various intensive formats to allow professionals to remain in the work force.

The Longueuil Campus hosts the applied research projects of its faculties along with others conducted in collaboration with Charles LeMoyne Hospital, an affiliated regional and university centre located in the Montérégie region. The campus is located on Montreal's South Shore across from the Longueuil-Université-de-Sherbrooke subway station.

The Joint Campus in Saguenay opened its doors in 1996 to medical students.

Also opening in 1996, the Joint Campus in Moncton, New Brunswick, offers medical training to French-speaking students.

Programs

The University of Sherbrooke offers a variety of bachelors, masters, doctoral and post-doctoral programs as well as various certificates and microprograms.

The Faculty of Theology, Ethics and Philosophy offers Undergraduate level certificate, diploma, Bachelors, Masters and Doctorate degrees in Theology/Theological Studies; Doctorate Theology and Religious Vocations; and Undergraduate level certificate/diploma/Graduate level certificate/diploma Pastoral Studies/Counselling.

The Faculty of Engineering offers courses in the following specialties: Chemical Engineering, Civil Engineering, Electrical Engineering, Computer Engineering, Biological Engineering and Mechanical Engineering.

Sports
Sports teams representing the Université de Sherbrooke are called Le Vert & Or (called The Green and Gold in English).

Media
The university publishes the magazine UdeS, which has a circulation of 85,000 copies. Published three times a year by the Communications Service, this magazine is distributed free to everyone in the central graduate database and to staff as well as friends of the institution. Copies are also distributed in a number of locations in Sherbrooke.

The university's student community puts out a student newspaper, the Collectif, and operates an FM radio station, CFAK-FM.

Ranking

Université de Sherbrooke has placed in several international post-secondary school rankings. In the 2022 Academic Ranking of World Universities rankings, the university ranked 501–600 in the world. The 2023 QS World University Rankings ranked the university 751–800 in the world and 24–26 in Canada. In U.S. News & World Report 2022–23 global university rankings, the university placed 789th.

The university has also placed in post-secondary national rankings, including the 2023 rankings published by Maclean's, which ranked Sherbrooke 15th in their Medical-Doctoral university category, and 20th in their reputation ranking for Canadian universities.

Associations and student groups

There are many associations and student groups at the University of Sherbrooke.

ADEEP

L'association des étudiantes et étudiants en pharmacologie. This association is a group for the pharmacology students, founded in 2007.

FEUS

Founded in 1955, the Fédération étudiante de l’Université de Sherbrooke represents all undergraduate students in the university. With 10 member associations and over 13,000 student members, it is one of the most important lobby groups in the Estrie region. It is a member of several external organizations, having formerly been affiliated with the Fédération étudiante universitaire du Québec (FEUQ), the Quebec Federation of University Students. As of 2016, it is not part of a province wide student organisation.

AGEFLESH

Founded in 1993, the Association générale des étudiants de la Faculté des lettres et sciences humaines de l’Université de Sherbrooke represents students in the Faculty of Letters and Humanities. It participated in the student strike movement against the $103 million in cuts to student financial assistance in the spring of 2005.

Since 2005, when it was accredited as sole representative of all students in the faculty, the association has fought against the monopoly held by a food-distribution company on the Sherbrooke Main Campus. It is preparing a business plan to set up a student cooperative cafe in the faculty.

AGEEMUS

Founded in 1969, the Association générale des étudiants en médecine de l’Université de Sherbrooke represents medical students attending the university's various satellite campuses (Longueuil, Chicoutimi, Moncton).

AGED

The Association générale étudiante de droit of the Université de Sherbrooke represents students in the Faculty of Law.

AGEG

The Association générale des étudiants de génie of the Université de Sherbrooke represents students in the Faculty of Engineering.

AGER

The Association générale des étudiants de réadaptation of the Université de Sherbrooke represents undergraduates in occupational therapy and physiotherapy.

AETEP

The Association des étudiants en théologie, éthique et philosophie of the Université de Sherbrooke represents students in the Faculty of Theology, Ethics and Philosophy.

AGES

Founded in 1959, the Association générale des étudiants en sciences of the Université de Sherbrooke represents students in the Faculty of Science. On March 17, 2010, the AGES won the Continuity Prize awarded by the FEUS at the Défi Étudiant for their 51 years of service.

AGEEFEUS

The Association générale des étudiants de la Faculté d'éducation de l’Université de Sherbrooke represents undergraduate students in the Faculty of Education and is a member of FEUS.

AGEMDEUS

The Association générale des étudiants de la maîtrise et du doctorat de la Faculté d'éducation de l’Université de Sherbrooke represents graduate students in the Faculty of Education. AGEMDEUS has over 400 members and is a member of REMDUS.

AEFA

The Association des étudiants de la Faculté d'administration of the Université de Sherbrooke represents students in the Faculty of Administration. This group is also an umbrella organisation for some of the other student associations. The COMITÉ CA represents people studying to be a Chartered Accountant. The COMITÉ CMA is represents Chartered Management Accountant students, and the COMITÉ CGA represents students taking a GCA degree.

FONDS ÉQUINOX represents students in finance. The people in Marketing are represented by the student association Markus. The human resources students have a group named GERHUS. RÉGIS is the association for people studying in managing information systems.

AGEESIUS

The Association des étudiants en science infirmière de l’Université de Sherbrooke represents students in nursing science.

AGEEP

The Association des étudiants en éducation physique of the Université de Sherbrooke represents students in the Faculty of Sports and Physical Education.

RECMUS

Regroupement des étudiants chercheurs en médecine de l'Université de Sherbrooke is a group for medical students.

RECPUS

The Regroupement des étudiants chercheurs en pharmacologie de l’Université de Sherbrooke represents pharmacology research students.

RECSEP

The Regroupement des étudiants de cycles supérieurs en études politiques represents political science students.

RECSUS

The Regroupement étudiant des chercheurs et chercheuses en sciences de l'Université de Sherbrooke represents graduate students from the Faculty of Sciences.

REMDUS

The Regroupement des étudiants en maîtrise et doctorat de l’Université de Sherbrooke represents all of the university's graduate students. It is affiliated with FEUQ, the Quebec Federation of University Students.

Notable faculty
 Roger Côté, Former Director of the Department of Pathology, Inceptor and Chair of the Editorial Board of the Systematized Nomenclature of Medicine, the largest international clinical nomenclature hosted by the International Healthcare Terminology Standards Development Organisation (IHTSDO) since 2006.
 , Professor of Chemical Engineering, Canadian entrepreneur and inventor. 2004 Recipient of the Prix Lionel-Boulet award by the Government of Quebec.
 André Lussier, Professor emeritus and pioneer of clinical rheumatology in Canada.
 , former Dean of Medicine, 1991 recipient of the Duncan-Graham Award of the Royal College of Physicians and Surgeons of Canada, Officer of the National Order of Quebec, and of the Ordre des Palmes académiques (an order of chivalry of France awarded to academics and educators).
 Pierre Deslongchamps, Professor emeritus and a leading organic chemist on the international scene.
 Charles Thiffault (born 1939), NHL ice hockey coach
 , Professor of Physics, Canada Research Chair in Quantum Materials. 2011 recipient of the Order of Canada for his work on understanding the behavior of electrons in matter.

Notable alumni

Jean Charest, Former Quebec Premier and former deputy prime minister of Canada.
Pierre-Marc Johnson, Former Quebec Premier
Liu Chao-shiuan, prime minister of Taiwan
Moulay Hafid Elalamy, Minister of Industry, Trade, Investment and Digital Economy of Morocco (34th richest personality in Africa according to Forbes 2015)
Aziz Akhannouch, a Chleuh-Berber Moroccan businessman and current Prime Minister of Morocco
Martin Coiteux, President of the council of treasury of Quebec under the government of Philippe Couillard 
Laurent Beaudoin, Chairman of the Board of Directors of Bombardier
Camille Leblanc-Bazinet - Fittest Woman on Earth, 2014 Reebok Crossfit Games
Jean-Christophe Beaulieu, Canadian football player
Monique Desroches, ethnomusicologist
Charles Sirois, Canadian businessman
Jean-René Dufort, Jean-René Dufort, comedy host on television and radio
Ouida Ramón-Moliner, anaesthetist
Anne Monique Nuyt, paediatrics researcher
Marc Nadon, supernumerary judge and former Supreme Court nominee
Simon Jolin-Barrette, Quebec minister of Justice and French Language

Commemorative stamp
On 4 May 2004 Canada Post issued 'Sherbrooke University, 1954-2004 / Université de Sherbrooke, 1954-2004' as part of the Canadian Universities series. The stamp was based on a design by Denis L'Allier and on a photograph by Guy Lavigueur. The 49¢ stamps are perforated 13.5 and were printed by Canadian Bank Note Company.

See also

 Bishop's University
 List of Quebec universities
 Higher education in Quebec
 Canadian Interuniversity Sport
 Canadian government scientific research organizations
 Canadian university scientific research organizations
 Canadian industrial research and development organizations

References

External links

 Official website
 Fédération étudiante de l'Université de Sherbrooke 

 
Seminaries and theological colleges in Canada
Educational institutions established in 1954
Education in Sherbrooke
Education in Longueuil
Buildings and structures in Sherbrooke
1954 establishments in Quebec
Universities in Quebec